Donogh Rees (born 1959) is a New Zealand actress. She starred in the long-running soap opera Shortland Street as director of nursing Judy Brownlee from 2001 to 2006.

She starred as Abbie in the sci-fi film Lorca and the Outlaws (1984), in the New Zealand film Constance (1985) in the title role, in the film Crush (1992) as the lead part of Christina, and the film Channelling Baby (1999). She voiced Necrolai in Power Rangers: Mystic Force, and has appeared in Hercules: The Legendary Journeys and Xena: Warrior Princess. She has appeared in numerous stage productions.

Filmography

Film

Television

References

External links
 
 Profile on TVNZ
 Short films starring Rees

1959 births
Living people
New Zealand actresses